The 2018 Paradise Jam was an early-season men's and women's college basketball tournament. The tournament, which began in 2000, was part of the 2018-19 NCAA Division I men's basketball season and 2018-19 NCAA Division I women's basketball season. After a year's absence due to major damage to the Virgin Islands from Hurricane Irma and Hurricane Maria, the tournament returned to the Sports and Fitness Center in Saint Thomas, U.S. Virgin Islands, Kansas State won the men's tournament, in the women's tournament Kentucky won the Island Division and UConn won the Reef Division.

Men's tournament

Bracket

Women's tournament
The women's tournament will be played from November 22–24. The women's tournament consists of 8 teams split into two 4-team, round-robin divisions: Island and Reef.

Island Division

Results

Island Division All-Tournament team 
 Rhyne Howard, Kentucky
 Kennedy Burke, UCLA
 Sydni Harvey, South Florida
 Taylor Murray, Kentucky
 Stephanie Watts, North Carolina

Reef Division

Reef Division All-Tournament team 
 Napheesa Collier, Connecticut
 Crystal Allen, Ole Miss
 Tiana England, St. John's
 Ae’Rianna Harris, Purdue
 Katie Lou Samuelson, Connecticut

References

Paradise Jam Tournament
Paradise Jam Tournament
Paradise Jam
Paradise Jam